Trouble in Mind was a short-lived British television sitcom series produced by LWT for ITV in 1991. It ran for nine episodes, each 30 minutes long. The series starred Richard O'Sullivan, Susan Penhaligon, Nicholas Day and Jim McManus.

Cast
 Richard O'Sullivan as Adam Charlesworth
 Susan Penhaligon as Julia Charlesworth
 Nicholas Day as Dr. Malcolm Barclay
 Jim McManus as Stanley Chambers

References

External links
 

1991 British television series debuts
1991 British television series endings
1990s British sitcoms
ITV sitcoms
London Weekend Television shows
English-language television shows
Television series by ITV Studios
Television shows set in London